It's a Game is an album by the Scottish group Bay City Rollers, issued in the summer of 1977.

Background
It's a Game was the band's fifth original studio album, and featured production by Harry Maslin, fresh off of success with David Bowie.  Despite receiving a Gold Album certification in the US, the group's popularity had waned considerably since their initial burst of fame, and this and subsequent albums would see diminishing success.

In the US the track "You Made Me Believe in Magic" was issued as lead single reaching No. 10 on the Hot 100 in Billboard in August 1977. Outside the US, the track "It's a Game", which had originally been a single in 1973 for British group String Driven Thing, was the usual first single off its parent album with Top Ten status achieved in Australia (#9), Austria (#9), Germany (#4), Ireland (#6) and Switzerland (#6) also reaching No. 21 in New Zealand and No. 16 in the UK; in the UK "It's a Game" was the twelfth Bay City Rollers chart hit and the first single of that twelve to peak below the Top Ten.

"You Made Me Believe in Magic" was released as a second single in the territories where the "It's a Game" single had been a hit, with "You Made Me Believe in Magic" proving significantly less popular than the precedent single, the relevant peaks for "You Made Me Believe in Magic" being Australia – No. 36, Germany – No. 25, New Zealand – No. 39 and the UK – No. 34, with no chart placing in Austria, Ireland or Switzerland. "You Made Me Believe in Magic" marked the Bay City Rollers' final UK chart appearance. Another track off the It's a Game album: "The Way I Feel Tonight", was issued as a second single in the US where it marked the Bay City Rollers' final Hot 100 appearance peaking at No. 24; outside the US "The Way I Feel Tonight" was the third single off the album charting in Australia (No. 56) and New Zealand (No. 38).

Guitarist Ian Mitchell, present on the Dedication LP, had quit the band in late 1976, to be replaced by Pat McGlynn.  McGlynn toured with the group and participated in initial sessions for It's a Game, but was soon dismissed from the band.  The finished product showed the Rollers as a four-piece band, McGlynn's contributions apparently not making the final cut.  The band would expand to a quintet again in 1978 as founding member Alan Longmuir re-joined the fold.

It's a Game was reissued on CD with three bonus tracks in October 2007 ("Are You Cuckoo", "Dedication (Les McKeown Version)" and "The Way I Feel Tonight (single version)".

Track listing

Side One
"It's a Game" (Chris Adams)
"You Made Me Believe in Magic" (Len Boone)
"Don't Let the Music Die" (Eric Faulkner, Stuart Wood)
"Love Power" (Teddy Vann)
"The Way I Feel Tonight" (Harvey Shield)

Side Two
"Love Fever" (Faulkner, Wood)
"Sweet Virginia" (Faulkner, Wood, Derek Longmuir, Les McKeown, Pat McGlynn)
"Inside a Broken Dream" (Faulkner, Wood, McKeown)
"Dance, Dance, Dance" (Faulkner, Wood)
"Rebel Rebel" (David Bowie)

Personnel
Eric Faulkner – Guitar, vocals
Derek Longmuir – Drums, vocals
Les McKeown – Lead Vocals
Stuart "Woody" Wood – Bass Guitar, vocals

Charts

Singles

References

Bay City Rollers albums
1977 albums
Arista Records albums